Naseer Ahmad (born 1 February 1995) is an Afghan cricketer. He made his List A debut for Khost Province in the 2019 Afghanistan Provincial Challenge Cup tournament on 31 July 2019.

References

External links
 

1995 births
Living people
Afghan cricketers